Broadcast programming is the practice of organizing or ordering (scheduling) of broadcast media shows, typically radio and television, in a daily, weekly, monthly, quarterly or season-long schedule.

Modern broadcasters use broadcast automation to regularly change the scheduling of their shows to build an audience for a new show, retain that audience, or compete with other broadcasters' shows. Most broadcast television shows are presented weekly in prime time or daily in other dayparts, though exceptions are not rare.

At a micro level, scheduling is the minute planning of the transmission; what to broadcast and when, ensuring an adequate or maximum utilization of airtime. Television scheduling strategies are employed to give shows the best possible chance of attracting and retaining an audience. They are used to deliver shows to audiences when they are most likely to want to watch them and deliver audiences to advertisers in the composition that makes their advertising most likely to be effective.

With the growth of digital platforms and services allowing non-linear, on-demand access to television content, this approach to broadcasting has since been referred to using the retronym linear (such as linear television and linear channels).

History
With the beginning of scheduled television in 1936, television programming was initially only concerned with filling a few hours each evening – the hours now known as prime time. Over time, though, television began to be seen during the daytime and late at night, as well on the weekends. As air time increased, so did the demand for new material. With the exception of sports television, variety shows became much more important in prime time.

Scheduling strategies

Lead-ins and lead-outs
Broadcasters may schedule a program to air before or after a widely-viewed tent-pole program, such as a popular series, or a special such as a high-profile sporting event, in the hope that audience flow will encourage the audience to tune-in early or stay for the second program. The second program is usually one that the broadcaster wants to promote to a wider audience, such as a new or lower-profile series. Sometimes, a lower-profile program may be scheduled between two tentpole programs, a technique known as hammocking.

Lead-outs can sometimes help to launch new programs and talent; in 1982, NBC premiered Late Night with David Letterman as a lead-out for its long-running late-night talk show The Tonight Show Starring Johnny Carson. Characterized by an off-beat style appealing to young adults, Late Night helped launch the career of host David Letterman, and influence later entries into the genre. Despite Carson's endorsement of Letterman as a successor following his 1992 retirement, NBC chose Jay Leno instead, and Letterman departed for CBS to host the Late Show as a competitor beginning in the 1993–94 season. Late Night would continue as a franchise with hosts such as Conan O'Brien and Jimmy Fallon—both of whom would later go on to host The Tonight Show (albeit briefly in the case of Conan). 

The same season, Fox scheduled The X-Files as a lead-out for its sci-fi western The Adventures of Brisco County Jr., with the expectation that Brisco County Jr. would serve as the anchor of its Friday-night lineup. However, The X-Files proved to be significantly more successful, and would eventually run for nine seasons. By contrast, viewership for Brisco County Jr. declined throughout the season, and the show was cancelled. Fox attempted to use other sci-fi shows as a lead-in for The X-Files (such as Sliders and VR.5), but they were similarly unsuccessful.

A weak lead-in can have an impact on the viewership of programs that follow; NBC's 2009 attempt to strip the talk show The Jay Leno Show (a spiritual successor to Leno's tenure of The Tonight Show after Conan O'Brien succeeded him) in a 10:00 p.m. ET/PT timeslot proved detrimental to the viewership of late local newscasts on its affiliates.

Blocks

Block programming is the practice of scheduling a group of complementary programs together. Blocks are typically built around specific genres (i.e. a block focusing specifically on sitcoms), target audiences, or other factors, with their programming often promoted collectively under blanket titles (such as ABC's "TGIF" lineup and NBC's "Must See TV").

Bridging
Bridging is the practice of discouraging the audience from changing channels during the "junctions" between specific programs. This can be done, primarily, by airing promos for the next program near the end of the preceding program, such as during its credits, or reducing the length of the junction between two programs as much as possible (hot switching). The host of the next program may similarly make a brief appearance near the end of the preceding program (sometimes interacting directly with the host) to provide a preview; in news broadcasting, this is typically referred to as a "throw" or "toss".

A bridge was used by ABC between Roseanne and the December 1992 series premiere of The Jackie Thomas Show, a new sitcom co-created by Roseanne and Tom Arnold of Roseanne fame. A scene of the Connor family watching the opening of the program seamlessly transitioned into the program itself, with no junction in between. ABC commissioned a minute-by-minute Nielsen ratings report, which showed that the majority of viewers from Roseanne had been retained during the premiere.

Owing to both programs' news comedy formats, the Comedy Central program The Daily Show used newscast-style toss segments to promote its new spin-off and lead-out, The Colbert Report, in which host Jon Stewart would engage in a comedic conversation with the latter's host, Stephen Colbert, via split-screen prior to The Daily Show's traditional closing segment "Your Moment of Zen". This practice was deconstructed by the December 18, 2014 episode of The Daily Show, where such a segment abruptly segued into the series finale of The Colbert Report. At its conclusion, the show transitioned back to Stewart, who concluded The Daily Show with Your Moment of Zen as normal (which, appropriately, showcased an outtake from a toss segment).

In some cases, a channel may intentionally allow a program to overrun into the next half-hour timeslot rather than end exactly on the half-hour, in order to discourage viewers from "surfing" away at traditional junction periods (since they had missed the beginnings of programs on other channels already). This can, however, cause disruptions with recorders if they are not aware of the scheduling (typically, digital video recorders can be configured to automatically record for a set length of time before and after a schedule's given timeslot in program guide data to account for possible variances). For a period, TBS intentionally engaged in this practice under the branding "Turner Time", scheduling all programs at 5 and 35 minutes past the hour rather than exactly on the half hour. Rather than discourage viewers from tuning away, TBS promoted this practice as a ploy to attract viewers tuning away from other channels.

Crossovers

Crossovers can be organized between multiple programs, in which a single storyline is extended across episodes of two or more separate programs. Typically, these involve programs that form a single franchise or shared universe, such as NBC's Chicago franchise and Law & Order: Special Victims Unit (all created by Dick Wolf), and the ABC dramas Grey's Anatomy and Station 19 (both created by Shonda Rhimes).

Counterprogramming

Counterprogramming is the practice of deliberately scheduling programming to attract viewers away from another, major program. Counterprogramming efforts often involve scheduling a contrasting program of a different genre or demographic, targeting viewers who may not be interested in the major program (such as a sporting event, which typically draws a predominantly-male audience, against an awards show that attracts a predominantly-female audience). Despite frequently being among the top U.S. television broadcasts of all time, the Super Bowl has had a prominent history of being counterprogrammed in this manner. One of the most prominent examples of this practice was Fox's 1992 airing of a special live episode of In Living Color against the game's halftime show.

Programs can also be counterprogrammed by a direct competitor in the same time slot, often resulting in the two programs attempting to attract viewers away from each other through publicity stunts and other tactics.

In some cases, broadcasters may attempt to adjust their schedules in order to avert attempts at counterprogramming, such as getting a slightly earlier time slot (in the hope that once viewers have become committed to a show they will not switch channels), or scheduling the competing program on a different night, or in a different portion of the television season to avoid competition altogether.

Dayparting

Dayparting is the practice of dividing the day into several parts, during each of which a different type program is appropriate for that time is aired. Daytime television shows are most often geared toward a particular demographic, and what the target audience typically engages in at that time.

Stripping

Stripping is the practice of running a single series in a consistent, daily time slot throughout the week, usually on weekdays. Daytime programs such as talk shows, court shows, game shows, and soap operas, are typically aired in a strip format. Outside of serial drama formats such as telenovelas where popular, strips are rarely used for first-run entertainment programming outside of limited events.

Syndicated reruns of network programs that originally aired on a weekly basis are often aired as strips. Shows that are syndicated in this way generally have to have run for several seasons (the rule of thumb is usually 100 episodes) in order to have enough episodes to run without significant repeats.

Marathons 

A marathon is the scheduling of a continuous, long-term block of programming as an event, usually devoted to airings of a single program or film franchise. When conducted using television series, a marathon may either consist of episodes aired in sequential order, or focus on episodes sharing specific themes. 

Marathons are often aired on holidays (such as Syfy's annual The Twilight Zone marathon on New Year's Day), as counterprogramming for major events airing on other channels (such as the Super Bowl in the U.S.), to lead into new episodes of a series, to commemorate milestones/events surrounding a specific series or franchise. Some marathons may focus on the roles of a specific entertainer; the death of Betty White resulted in multiple marathons of programming featuring her television appearances on and around January 17, 2022 (which would have been her 100th birthday), with Hallmark Channel airing a marathon of The Golden Girls, and the game show centric channels Buzzr and Game Show Network airing marathons of game show episodes that featured White as a celebrity guest.  

While longer marathons are typically reserved for major events, the popularization of binge-watching via streaming services in the 2010s led to many U.S. cable networks adopting marathon-like blocks of programs as part of their regular schedules. To compete with the release practices of streaming services, TBS premiered entire seasons of its police comedy Angie Tribeca in a marathon format. Similarly, free ad-supported streaming television (FAST) services often feature narrowly-focused linear channels devoted to specific programs or franchises.

Theming
A broadcaster may temporarily dedicate all or parts of its schedule over a period of time to a specific theme. A well-known instance of a themed lineup is Discovery Channel's annual "Shark Week". Themed schedules are a common practice around major holidays—such as Valentine's Day, Halloween, and Christmas—where channels may air episodes of programs, specials, and films that relate to the holiday. Channels may also air marathons of their signature programs and film rights to target viewers off from school or work. 

The U.S. basic cable networks Freeform (25 Days of Christmas, 31 Days of Halloween) and Hallmark Channel are known for broadcasting long-term holiday programming events. After experiencing success with holiday events such as Countdown to Christmas, Hallmark Channel adopted a practice of dividing its programming into themed seasons year-round, which are accompanied by thematically-appropriate original made-for-TV films and series. This strategy is part of an effort to position the channel as "a year-round destination for celebrations", and is synergistic with Hallmark Cards' core greeting card and collectibles businesses.

Time slot
A show's time slot or place in the schedule could be crucial to its success or failure; generally, earlier prime time slots have a stronger appeal towards family viewing and younger demographics, while later time slots generally appeal more towards older demographics. Some time slots, colloquially known as "graveyard slots" or "death slots", are prone to having smaller potential audiences (with one such example in the U.S. being Friday nights), or intense competition from highly-rated series.

See also
Audience flow
Broadcast clock
Effects of time zones on North American broadcasting
Electronic media
Fall schedule
Interstitial program
Radio Computing Services – automated scheduling for radio stations
Timeshift channel
TV Guide
TV listings

References

Broadcasting